Loyal to Familia is a Danish street gang.

Origins 
Loyal to Familia was established in Nørrebro in Copenhagen, Denmark in 2013. In the summer of 2017, the gang had a membership of 225.

Prohibition 
In August 2017, the Minister of Justice Søren Pape Poulsen asked the Rigspolitiet and the Attorney General to consider whether there is a basis for dissolution by judgment.

On September 1, 2021, the Danish Supreme Court ruled that Loyal to Familia was unconstitutional because it lacked a legal purpose, and ordered it dissolved. The case was unusual in that it was the first time since 1924 that the Supreme Court had ordered an association dissolved.

See also 

 Crime in Denmark

References 

Gangs in Denmark